Durham Constabulary is the territorial police force responsible for policing ceremonial county of County Durham in North East England. The force’s area is bordered by Cumbria Constabulary to the west, Cleveland Police to the south east, North Yorkshire Police to the south and Northumbria Police to the north.

, the force has 1,168 police officers, 129 special constables, and 131 police community support officers (PCSO).

History

Durham Constabulary was one of the first county police forces to be set up, established in 1839. The force absorbed Durham City Police (formed in 1836) in 1921, Hartlepool Borough Police (formed in 1851) in 1947, Sunderland Borough Police (formed in 1837) in 1967, and Gateshead Borough Police (formed in 1836) and South Shields Borough Police (formed in 1839) in 1968, when it also lost some of its area to Teesside Constabulary.

In 1965, the force had an establishment of 1,763 and an actual strength of 1,626.

As a result of the Local Government Act 1972, the northern area of the force including Gateshead, Sunderland and South Shields became part of the Northumbria Police area, whilst Hartlepool and Stockton-on-Tees in the south-east became part of the jurisdiction of Cleveland Constabulary in 1974.

Chief constables
 1848–1892: Colonel George Francis White
 1892–1902: John Henry Eden
 1902–1922: William George Morant
 1922–1942: Sir George Morley (knighted in 1937 Coronation Honours)
 1943–1944: Captain H. Studdy
 1944–1950: Colonel Sir Eric St Johnston (afterwards Chief Constable of Lancashire, 1950–67)
 1950–1970: Alec A. Muir
 1970–1976: Arthur George "Peter" Puckering
 1981–1988: Eldred James Boothby
 1988–1997: Frank Taylor
 1997–2002: George Hedges
 2002–2005: Paul T. Garvin
 2005–2012: Jon Stoddart
 2012–2019: Michael Barton
 2019–present: Jo Farrell

Officers killed in the line of duty

The Police Roll of Honour Trust and Police Memorial Trust list and commemorate all British police officers killed in the line of duty. Since its establishment in 1984, the Police Memorial Trust has erected 50 memorials nationally to some of those officers.

Since 1960, the following officers of Durham Constabulary were killed while attempting to prevent or stop a crime in progress:
PC Keith Maddison, 1997 (collapsed and died while pursuing suspects from a stolen vehicle)
DC James Brian Porter, 1982 (shot dead by two armed robbers, posthumously awarded the Queen's Commendation for Brave Conduct)
PC Glenn Russel Corder, 1980 (his vehicle crashed during a police pursuit)
PC William Ralph Shiell, 1940 (shot dead by burglars)
PC Matthew Walls Straughan, 1927 (shot dead by a suspect)

Operations
Durham Constabulary is managed by Chief Constable Jo Farrell and her executive team, composed of Deputy Chief Constable Dave Orford, Temporary Assistant Chief Constable John Ward, Assistant Chief Officer Gary Ridley.

The force operates through a number of functional commands: Neighbourhood And Safeguarding, Response Policing, Crime and Criminal Justice, Tasking and Co-ordination and Support Services, which all report to the Executive Team.
 
Since 2010, Durham Constabulary and neighbouring Cleveland Police have shared road policing and firearms teams through a joint Specialist Operations Unit. These officers are based at Wynyard Park Business Park and Spennymoor. Durham and Cleveland Police have shared a tactical training centre in Urlay Nook, near Teesside International Airport (formerly Durham Tees Valley Airport), since 2001.

, the force has 1,168 police officers, 129 special constables, and 131 police community support officers (PCSO), 65 police support volunteers (PSV), and 924 staff.

PEEL inspection
His Majesty's Inspectorate of Constabulary and Fire & Rescue Services (HMICFRS) conducts a periodic police effectiveness, efficiency and legitimacy (PEEL) inspection of each police service's performance. In its latest PEEL inspection,  was rated as follows:

See also
Durham Police and Crime Commissioner
Law enforcement in the United Kingdom
 List of law enforcement agencies in the United Kingdom, Crown Dependencies and British Overseas Territories

References

External links

 
 Durham at HMICFRS
 

Constabulary
Police forces of England
Government agencies established in 1839
1839 establishments in England